LBJ/Central station is a DART Light Rail station in Dallas, Texas. It is located at T.I. Boulevard and Markville Drive near the High Five Interchange in the Lake Highlands area.

The  runs to Parker Road during rush hours. Other times, during off-peak (middays, late evenings and weekends), it terminates here instead.

The columns supporting the station's roof have circuit boards embedded inside, owing to the area's prominence as a technology hub. The station is located across Interstate 635 from Texas Instruments.

References

External links
 DART - LBJ/Central Station

Dallas Area Rapid Transit light rail stations in Dallas
Railway stations in the United States opened in 2002
2002 establishments in Texas
Railway stations in Dallas County, Texas